Bernard I (died 995), called the Cross-Eyed, was the first Count of Armagnac.

He was the second son of William Garcés of Fézensac.

For his many sins, Bernard planned a pilgrimage to Jerusalem, but never accomplished the feat. Instead, he founded a basilica dedicated to Saint Orens of Auch. His son Gerald succeeded him.

Sources
Monlezun, Jean Justin. Histoire de la Gascogne. 1846.

995 deaths
Counts of Armagnac
10th-century French people
Year of birth unknown